Elqui Valley may refer to:

 Elqui River, a river in northern Chile
 Elqui Valley (wine region), a wine region centered on Elqui River